The Lake Country Limited was a short-lived Amtrak route which connected Chicago, Illinois with Janesville, Wisconsin. The route was part of Amtrak's Network Growth Strategy, which envisioned an expanded role for mail and express business. The Lake Country Limited would have exchanged goods with a new Chicago–Philadelphia train named the Skyline Connection, which in the end never began operation. The previous time when there was interstate train service along the route was the era immediately before Amtrak (April 30, 1971) when the Chicago, Milwaukee, St. Paul and Pacific Railroad (Milwaukee Road) operated the Sioux and the Varsity trains.

Route 
Trains originated at Chicago's Union Station and ran north over the tracks of Metra's Milwaukee District / North Line. Northwest of Fox Lake, Illinois, it ran over tracks owned by the Wisconsin and Southern Railroad and the state of Wisconsin to a temporary platform outside of Janesville.

The initial route was Chicago–Glenview–Janesville; on June 15, 2000, an additional stop was added at Zenda, Wisconsin to serve Lake Geneva, Wisconsin, a popular resort community. The train consisted of one diesel engine, one coach car, and one non-powered control unit (NPCU).

References

External links 
 2000 timetable

Former Amtrak routes
Railway services introduced in 2000
Railway services discontinued in 2001
Passenger rail transportation in Illinois
Passenger rail transportation in Wisconsin